Sarangapani was a Carnatic musician of the 17th century.

Sarangapani may also refer to:
 Sarangapani Temple, a Hindu temple situated in Tanjore, Tamil Nadu, India
 Sarangapanipettai, a village in Tanjore district, Tamil Nadu

Persons with the surname
 Jagannathan Sarangapani, American engineer
 P. K. Sarangapani, Malayalam screenwriter and playwright
 Thamizhavel G. Sarangapani, Tamil writer and publisher
 K. Sarangapani, Indian actor